is a stable of sumo wrestlers, part of the Tokitsukaze ichimon or group of stables. Its current head coach is former maegashira Kitakachidoki. As of January 2023 it had 12 wrestlers.

History
The name of Isenoumi stable relates to one of the oldest elder names in sumo, dating back to the mid-eighteenth century. The legendary Tanikaze, one of the first yokozuna, and his protégé Raiden, arguably the greatest rikishi ever, were both members of the first stable to be named Isenoumi. Its current incarnation, however, dates from 1949. In the 1960s the stable produced yokozuna Kashiwado, who upon his retirement left to found Kagamiyama stable in 1970. In December 1982 former sekiwake Fujinokawa took charge of the stable.

The retirement of Tosanoumi in December 2010 briefly left Isenoumi stable without any sekitori for the first time since 1983, until Ikioi was promoted to the jūryō division a year later. The former Fujinokawa reached the mandatory retirement age of 65 in September 2011 and passed the stable to former maegashira Kitakachidoki.  The stable was for a long time situated in Tokyo's Edogawa ward, and to help tackle the high crime rate in that area, the former Isenoumi-oyakata instructed his wrestlers to go on night patrols, the first stable to do so. In April 2012 the stable moved to new facilities in Bunkyo ward.

The stable had a policy of not accepting foreign-born wrestlers or ex-university competitors, but the Mongolian Arauma joined in 2020.

In July 2021 it absorbed the small Kagamiyama stable, now down to just two wrestlers, which had originally branched off from it in 1970.

Owners
2011–present: 12th Isenoumi Hayato (riji, former maegashira Kitakachidoki)
1982-2011: 11th Isenoumi Yukishige (former sekiwake Fujinokawa)
1949-1982: 10th Isenoumi Hirotake (former maegashira Kashiwado)

Notable active wrestlers

Nishikigi  (best rank maegashira)
Kagamiō (best rank maegashira)

Coaches
Kabutoyama Tsuyoshi (iin, former maegashira Ōikari)
Takashima Daizō (iin, former sekiwake Kōbōyama)
Tatekawa Toshio (shunin, former sekiwake Tosanoumi)
Kasugayama Shōta (toshiyori, former sekiwake Ikioi)

Notable former members
Kashiwado, (the 47th yokozuna)
Hattori (former maegashira)

Referee
Shikimori Kainosuke (Sandanme gyoji, real name Kaito Saita)

Usher
Masayuki (jonidan yobidashi, real name Masayuki Takagi)

Hairdresser
Tokomasa (second class tokoyama)
Tokoharu (third class tokoyama)

Location and access
Tokyo, Bunkyō ward, Sengoku 1-22-2
5 minute walk from Sengoku Station on the Toei Mita Line

See also
List of sumo stables
List of active sumo wrestlers
List of past sumo wrestlers
Glossary of sumo terms

References

External links
Official site 
Japan Sumo Association profile

Active sumo stables